Trinidadian and Tobagonian Canadians are Canadian citizens who are fully or partially of Trinidadian and Tobagonian descent or persons having those origins and having Canadian citizenship. There were 78,965 Trinidadian and Tobagonian Canadians in 2016, with the majority of them living in Toronto, specifically in the Thistletown and Eglinton West neighbourhoods as well as throughout Scarborough.

Demographics

Notable Trinidadian and Tobagonian Canadians

See also
 Canada–Trinidad and Tobago relations
 Black Canadians
 Indo-Canadians
 Trinidadian Americans
 Trinidadian British
 Trinidadian Australians

References

External links
History of Trinidadian Canadians

Trinidad
 
Canada